Acidic paper is paper that had some acidic substances used during the manufacture process. This type of paper, widely used since the mid-nineteenth century, turns yellow in a short time and becomes extremely brittle, which causes huge losses in library and archives collections.

Causes of paper degradation 

Paper degradation is a slow process, but it is significantly accelerated in an acidic environment. In the mid-nineteenth century, the method of paper production became popular, in which resin-alum glue was added to the paper pulp. The aluminum sulphate remaining in the paper form, in reaction with water, acids that catalyze the decomposition of cellulose (acidic hydrolysis). In this process, the cellulose chains are shortened, which reduces the tear resistance of the paper, and at the same time increases the cross-linking of their structure  that causes the paper to stiffen and become brittle. Parallel to the degradation under the influence of water, the cellulose chains react with oxygen, in result of oxidation the chains are also shortened. Not only cellulose, but also the lignin contained in the paper is oxidized, which leads to the yellowing of the paper.

The breakdown of the cellulose chains leads to a gradual deterioration of the condition of the paper and eventually to its complete degradation, a process known as "slow fire". Paper acidification is also accelerated by external factors, especially nitrogen and sulfur oxides present in the polluted air.

Consequences for archival 

The process of self-degradation of paper causes exceptional difficulties in safeguarding the collections of archives and libraries. For example, an analysis of the book collections of the Jagiellonian Library, Adam Mickiewicz University in Poznań, Książnica Cieszyńska, the AGH University of Science and Technology and the Cracow University of Technology proved that as much as 90% of the resources published by the mid-1990s (to be precise in 1996 in Poland) have all the features of acidic paper. It turned out that these institutions, established to care for the heritage of the past, are not able to effectively carry out their mission.

Although the degradation of paper cannot be undone (it can only be slowed down), deacidification is a particularly important form of conservation of the collections. Unfortunately, due to the efficiency limitations of the technologies used and the rapid pace of paper degradation, it is not possible to save all the documents from the 19th and 20th centuries. In the policy of mass deacidification, it seems necessary to establish such criteria for selecting endangered documents that will allow the most important and valuable cultural evidence to survive. Moreover, for the protection of paper collections, their digitization and microfilming are very important, as well as ensuring appropriate conditions for their sharing and storage (e.g. the use of acid-free archival files that protect against the harmful effects of the environment or limiting exposure to light, especially in the UV range as well as visible range).

Paper de-acidification 
An example of a large-scale endeavor for de-acidification of paper publications was the project carried out in Poland, initiated under the Multiannual Governmental Program "Acidic Paper", which operated in the years 2000–2008. It was a program proposed jointly by the community of librarians (from Jagiellonian Library) and chemists (from the Faculty of Chemistry of the Jagiellonian University), who in January 1998 formulated the "Memorial about the need to save the heritage of Polish culture in the library and archives of the 19th and 20th centuries" addressed to the Prime Minister of the Republic of Poland. (authors: A. Barański, J. Grochowski, A. Manikowski, D. Nałęcz, K. Zamorski). The American Bookkeeper technology was chosen to deacidify paper in Poland on a mass scale, in which the deacidifying agent is fine crystalline magnesium oxide, and its carrier is an organic liquid perfluoroheptane, neutral to inks, paints and dyes. Bookkeeper technology is environmentally friendly and allows for full regeneration of perfluoroheptane.

Books are immersed in a de-acidifying liquid and gently moved, thanks to which the magnesium oxide penetrates into the structure of the paper. Deacidification takes place in vertical and horizontal chambers. The first is for books of typical sizes, the second is for large or heavy items such as magazines or archives. The system is complemented by a set for manual deacidification of particularly weakened cards.

The first technological hall in Poland with installations for mass de-acidification of printed and manuscript paper in the form of bound volumes and loose cards is the Paper Clinic of the Jagiellonian Library in Krakow, opened in 2005. The annual capacity of its installation is about 35 tons of library materials. The second Bookkeeper installation has been operating at the National Library since 2007, and its capacity is estimated at 50 tons of library materials per year

Acid-free paper 
In recent years, most books have been printed on acid-free paper, the properties of which are defined by the ISO 9706 standard norm ISO 9706. The use of durable paper with characteristics that guarantee a long service life should become the rule, especially for valuable documents that are part of the cultural, protected and protected heritage stored for future generations.

References

External links 

 Klinika Papieru Biblioteki Jagiellońskiej
 Wieloletni Program Rządowy „Kwaśny papier”

Printing and writing paper
Paper products